The 1964 Australian Tourist Trophy was a motor race staged at the Longford Circuit in Tasmania, Australia on 29 February 1964. It was the eighth annual Australian Tourist Trophy race. The race was open to sports cars as defined by the Confederation of Australian Motor Sport (CAMS) in its Appendix C regulations, and it was recognized by CAMS as the Australian championship for sports cars. It was won by Frank Matich driving a Lotus 19B.

Results

Race statistics
 Race distance: 23 laps – 103½ miles
 Number of starters: not yet ascertained
 Number of finishers: not yet ascertained
 Race average: 101.25 mph
 Fastest lap: 2 minute 53.9 seconds, Frank Matich, (Lotus 19B)
 Best time on Flying Mile: 150 mph, Frank Matich, (Lotus 19B)

Stillwell was the first competitor to finish however he was disqualified for having received a push-start prior to the commencement of the race.
 
Coad was disqualified for a similar infringement.

References

Australian Tourist Trophy
Tourist Trophy
Motorsport in Tasmania